Balacra compsa is a moth of the family Erebidae. It was described by Karl Jordan in 1904. It is found in Angola, Burundi, the Democratic Republic of the Congo, Kenya, Rwanda and Uganda.

References

Balacra
Moths described in 1904
Erebid moths of Africa